Pasztowa Wola-Kolonia  is a village in the administrative district of Gmina Rzeczniów, within Lipsko County, Masovian Voivodeship, in east-central Poland.

References

Pasztowa Wola-Kolonia